YouTube is an American video-sharing website headquartered in San Bruno, California. 

In 2012, "Je m'appelle Funny Bear" by German virtual singer Gummibär became the first French music video to reached 100 million views.

Billion View Club
An early metric of a video's popularity was the so-called Billion View Club, denoting videos which had succeeded in reaching over 1 billion views since their initial upload. In October 2017, "Mi Gente" is the first French music video to reach one billion views, it's also the 27th most viewed video on the site.

As of April 2021, 13 videos have exceeded 400 million views.

Top videos
The following table lists top-20 most-viewed French music videos on YouTube with their approximative view count, uploader, artist, language and upload date.

Notes

See also
 List of most-viewed YouTube videos
 French pop music
 French rock
 Music of France

References

Lists of YouTube videos
Lists of music videos
Dynamic lists
French music
Internet in France
French music videos